{{DISPLAYTITLE:C19H28O6S}}
The molecular formula C19H28O6S (molar mass: 384.487 g/mol, exact mass: 384.1607 u) may refer to:

 15α-Hydroxy-DHEA sulfate
 16α-Hydroxy-DHEA sulfate

Molecular formulas